Tales from Underwood is a collection of fantasy, horror and science fiction short stories by American writer  David H. Keller. It was released in 1952 and was the author's first collection published in association with Arkham House.  It was also the first of only two books published by Pellegrini & Cudahy for Arkham House.  It was released in an edition of 3,500 copies.

Most of the stories had originally appeared in the magazines Weird Tales and Amazing Stories.

Contents

Tales from Underwood contains the following stories:

 "Introduction"
 "The Worm"
 "Revolt of the Pedestrians"
 "The Yeast Men"
 "The Ivy War"
 "The Doorbell"
 "The Flying Fool"
 "The Psychoponic Nurse"
 "A Biological Experiment"
 "Free as the Air"
 "The Bridle"
 "Tiger Cat"
 "The God Wheel"
 "The Golden Bough"
 "The Jelly Fish"
 "The Opium Eater"
 "The Thing in the Cellar"
 "The Moon Artist"
 "Creation Unforgivable"
 "The Dead Woman"
 "The Door"
 "The Perfumed Garden"
 "The Literary Corkscrew"
 "A Piece of Linoleum"

Sources

1952 short story collections
Fantasy short story collections
Science fiction short story collections by David H. Keller
Horror short story collections